Mikhail Andreyevich Tikhonov (born 17 July 1998) is a Russian football player. He plays as right-back or right midfielder for Chayka Peschanokopskoye on loan from Rodina Moscow.

Club career
He made his professional debut in the Russian Cup for FC Yenisey Krasnoyarsk on 24 August 2016 in a game against FC Dynamo Barnaul.

He made his Russian Football National League debut for FC Yenisey Krasnoyarsk on 10 September 2016 in a game against FC Khimki.

He made his Russian Premier League debut with FC Krylia Sovetov Samara on 11 August 2018 as a last-minute substitute in a game against FC Rostov.

On 20 August 2021, he signed a one-year contract with SKA-Khabarovsk.

Personal life
He is a son of Andrey Tikhonov.

References

External links
 
 
 
 Profile by Russian Football National League

1998 births
Footballers from Moscow
Living people
Russian footballers
Association football defenders
FC Krasnodar players
FC Yenisey Krasnoyarsk players
PFC Krylia Sovetov Samara players
FC Khimki players
FC SKA-Khabarovsk players
FC Chayka Peschanokopskoye players
Russian Premier League players
Russian First League players
Russian Second League players